Rophnan Nuri Muzeyin (Amharic: ሮፍናን ኑሪ ሙዘይን; born 22 June 1990), known mononymously as Rophnan (stylized as all caps), is an Ethiopian musician, singer, songwriter, DJ, and audio engineer. Widely acclaimed, he is currently considered as one of the most influential artists in Ethiopia. Rophnan entered into the mainstream recognition after his ground-breaking debut album Reflection, which introduced a completely new style of Ethiopian music and pioneered electronic music in Ethiopia.

Early life 
Rophnan was born and raised in Addis Ababa, Ethiopia. He is the ninth child out of 10 children in his family. His father named him Rophnan after having a revelation during deep prayer, the name Rophnan is not in Amharic nor does it have roots in any other language. When he was 10 years old, Rophnan started recording tapes in his classroom, singing and improvising drums to entertain his friends. His music style uniquely merges traditional Ethiopian instruments with contemporary electronic music.

Career

2006–2014: Early years
At 16 years old, Rophnan released his first mixtape which introduced him to Ethiopian club scene. The mixtape became an instant success, and in a market lacking local producers, DJs were playing it all across the country. The Mahmoud Ahmed's remix of the legendary song "Bemin Sebeb Litash" gained the most attention. The remix showcased Rophnan's ability to translate traditional melodies and rhymes into powerful electronic anthems.

Rophnan continued to DJ in clubs and venues in Addis Ababa while creating and developing his own sound, a fusion of Ethiopian cultural elements, unique vocals and cutting edge music.

2014–2018: Career beginnings
In the following years, Rophnan slowly established himself as the country's biggest DJ while introducing the country to electronic music. He had residencies in all the top clubs in Addis Ababa, often playing 3 shows a night. Rophnan kept his own music unreleased and made sure that the only place one could hear his tracks would be when he played them himself. One of Rophnan signature tracks, "Get To Work", a Gurage-based beat, was released this way and was played exclusively as part of Rophnan's own DJ sets, which made the song famous within Addis Ababa youth without having to release it.  Rophnan played a pivotal role in the rise of electronic music and DJ culture in Ethiopia. He continued to headline more and more events packing the biggest venues.

2018–2019: Reflection

On 17 May 2018, Rophnan released his debut album Reflection. This was the first electronic music LP to ever be released in Ethiopia.
The album was released independently by RAEY Records. A shorter version of the album, named Reflection E.P. was released by the Ghanaian label Akwaaba Music. 
Reflection was deeply rooted in raw traditional Ethiopian music but also mixing futuristic aesthetics into the powerful songs which reflected Rophnan's generation and artistic vision.
Introducing a new musical message, the album took a little while to be absorbed by the Ethiopian market, but in just a few months, the album's reach expanded from clubs, to street corners, to radio stations and finally became the most played album of the year. Respectively, Rophnan became one of the most celebrated artists in the country.
The release of the album coincided with a governmental change which brought consciousness to the youth of Ethiopia, and Reflection became the soundtrack of those winds of change.
Soon after the album release Rophnan has performed live in the popular Ehud Be EBS  TV show where he delivered a 10-minute set of live music, becoming the first artist ever to not lip-sync on the show. The video went viral and was viewed by millions.

The album won Rophnan three 2018's Leza Awards including Album of The Year, becoming a ground breaking release for an emerging genre.
In his acceptance speech, staying true to the generation who brought him to this point in his career,  Rophnan said: 

2018 also saw world-famous music group Major Lazer feature the track "Get To Work" on their "Africa To The World" compilation, highlighting Rophnan's place in the forefront of contemporary African music. At the end of the 2018 Rophnan participated in Coke Studio Africa in Nairobi, where a collaboration with Zambian Rapper Chef 187 resulted in an original track named "All The Way". The powerful track and the use of ancient African instrumentation, together with cutting-edge sound design, drew positive feedback across the continent and became one of the season musical highlights.

Rophnan gained a sweeping number of fans (stylized as Phans) by being a representative of a new generation's creative force in Ethiopia.  This status manifested itself in an unprecedented scope of digital following, memes, fan art and social trends. The "Rophside", a side view picture which imitated the album art and Rophnan's favorite picture pose, itself derived from the long time tradition of Ethiopian emperors and rulers posing in profile, became an internet phenomenon and trending hashtag.

At the first half of 2019  Rophnan went on the My Generation national tour, packing up stadiums across the country with his "Phans". The opening show of the tour broke the attendance record for Ghion, with massive crowds showing up, thousands beyond the venue capacity, resulting in commotion and police brutality. The tour was the first to sell tickets via electronic means.

In July 2019, Rophnan was featured on Forbes Africa's 30 under 30 list in the Creative Category, naming Rophnan as one of the continent biggest influencers that year.  Rophnan is the first Ethiopian musician to be featured on the list.

2021–2022: SOST and Sidist VI
Rophnan released a 16 minutes long three song compilation called SOST (Amharic stylized as ሦስት III) on 17 May 2021. Three singles have premiered on his YouTube page. Since its release, SOST has gained massive success in Ethiopia by getting 2 million views within just a week. On 24 December, Rophnan released a single titled "Tesfa". In June 2022, Rophnan announced contract sign with Universal Records and release of his second album, Sidist VI which was released on 11 July.

Discography
Studio albums

EPs

Singles

References

External links

Story on The Reporter

1990 births
Living people
21st-century Ethiopian male singers
Record producers
Ethiopian DJs
Musicians from Addis Ababa
Electronic dance music DJs
Dubstep musicians
Deep house musicians